Prasmita Mangaraj (born ) is an Indian female weightlifter, competing in the 58 kg category and representing India at international competitions. She competed at world championships, most recently at the 2003 World Weightlifting Championships.

Major results

References

1977 births
Living people
Indian female weightlifters
Place of birth missing (living people)
Weightlifters at the 2002 Commonwealth Games
Commonwealth Games medallists in weightlifting
Commonwealth Games silver medallists for India
Commonwealth Games bronze medallists for India
21st-century Indian women
20th-century Indian women
Medallists at the 2002 Commonwealth Games